Hertha Hareiter (1923 - 2015) was an Austrian art director. She designed the sets for a number of films in the postwar years. She was married to the fellow set designer Otto Pischinger and often collaborated with him.

Selected filmography
 The Confession of Ina Kahr (1954)
 Dear Miss Doctor (1954)
 A Heart Full of Music (1955)
 Royal Hunt in Ischl (1955)
 My Aunt, Your Aunt (1956)
 Old Heidelberg (1959)
 Peter Voss, Hero of the Day (1959)
 As the Sea Rages (1959)
 Final Accord (1960)
 The Dream of Lieschen Mueller (1961)
 The Marriage of Mr. Mississippi (1961)
 The Turkish Cucumbers (1962)
 Snow White and the Seven Jugglers (1962)
 The Last Ride to Santa Cruz (1964)
 Condemned to Sin (1964)
 The Pyramid of the Sun God (1965)
 DM-Killer (1965)
 The Treasure of the Aztecs (1965)
 How to Seduce a Playboy (1966)
 Maigret and His Greatest Case (1966)
 The Castle (1968)
 Madame and Her Niece (1969)
 The Salzburg Connection (1972)
 The Winds of War (1983, TV series)

References

Bibliography 
Sarah Miles Bolam & Thomas J. Bolam. The Presidents on Film: A Comprehensive Filmography of Portrayals from George Washington to George W. Bush. McFarland & Company, 2007.

External links 
 

1923 births
Austrian art directors
Film people from Vienna
2015 deaths